Louis Henri Deschamps was a French painter born on 25 May 1846 in Montélimar, (Drome); died 8 August 1902 in Montélimar.

Biography
He exhibited his paintings  at the Salon (Paris) from 1872 to 1889, then at the Salon of the National Society of Fine Arts from 1890 to 1900, as well as in the Salons of the Society of Friends of the Arts of Bordeaux. In 1877 he won a bronze medal at the Salon and an other at the Exposition Universelle (1889) in Paris. On 8 December 1892 he was made knight of the Legion of Honour for artistic merits. In 1884  he presented at the Salon  with some of the other most prestigious painters an illustration of the poem “Thing seen on a spring day” from Victor Hugo's National Edition of Contemplations. The original  has been lost but a  detailed study for the composition of the Salon, or a partial reduction is now at Maison de Victor Hugo - Hauteville House. Deschamps was very fond of his hometown where he spent few months every year and for the remainder lived in Paris, first in boulevard Berthier 31 and then, like other artists of the late 19th and early 20th centuries, in rue Laugier in the 17th arrondissement. After he was awarded with a gold medal at the Exposition Universelle (1900) in Paris the symptoms of a disease forced him to retire to his native Montelimar and led to his death in August 1902. He was an appreciated painting teacher and among his pupils can be remembered  William Marshall Brown (1863 – 1936),  Florence MacKubin (1857 – 1918),  (1850-1933), Alice Stone (1859 - 1952) and among the artists from Montelimar: Louis Discours (1870 - after 1915) and Charles Drivon (1860 - after 1903) whose artistic production was greatly influenced by his master. A silver photograph on cardboard of Louis Deschamps, by Eugène Pirou, is at the Musée d'Orsay. The rue Louis Deschamps in Montélimar was named in his honor.

Artwork
Louis Deschamps enjoyed academic and commercial success, exhibiting at the Paris Salon, from 1872, firstly his historical genre and then scenes of rustic life. It was in Paris where he developed his great talent. He also painted in watercolour and pastel, subjects, which included portraits, religious scenes, historical genre and paintings illustrating social and human themes such as  poor peasants, abandoned babies and seduced young girls often using young natural peasant girls as his models and inspiration. His brushwork is dense and pasty. The facial expressions of his sitters, of great emotional intensity, are rendered with muffled tones and unfinished shapes and emerge, with contrast, from the dark backgrounds. The color is spread on the canvas with a brushstroke of great spontaneity following a sudden inspiration almost in the absence of a preparatory drawing. Some of his works became so famous that they were reproduced in prints.

Works
 “Children and chicks”, 1873, oil on canvas, St Pierre church - Le Renouard - Orne - Lower Normandy
 “Moses saved from the waters”, 1875, oil on canvas 
 “Hagar and the Favorite, 1876, oil on canvas
 “The poor girl”, 1877, oil on canvas
 “The Small Screening Machine”, 1878, oil on canvas, Montélimar museum.
 “The death of Mireille”, 1879, oil on canvas, an episode of the "Mirèio" by Frédéric Mistral, Musée des beaux-arts de Marseille
 “Prayer”,1880, oil on canvas,  
 “Vincent wounded”, 1881, oil on canvas, an episode of the "Mireille" by Frédéric Mistral, Calvet Museum in Avignon
 “Resignation”,1882, oil on canvas
 “Portrait of an old man”, 1882, oil on wood 
 “The daughter-mother”, 1883, oil on canvas
 “The Contemplations (V. Hugo)”, 1884, oil on canvas, Maison de Victor Hugo - Hauteville House
 "The abandoned" or "The infant", 1885, Fine Arts Museums of San Francisco
 “A young girl holding a violin” 1885, oil on canvas 
 “The baby” 1886, oil on canvas, Royal Museums of Fine Arts of Belgium.
 “Paternity search” 1887, oil on canvas, Brou Museum in Bourg-en-Bresse.
 “The abandoned”,  Watercolor, Louvre museum in Paris (graphic arts department)
 “Crazy woman” Gray wash, Louvre museum in Paris (graphic arts department)
 “The charity”, oil on canvas, Orsay Museum 
 “The abandoned”, oil on canvas, Orsay Museum

External links
 https://commons.wikimedia.org/wiki/Category:Louis_Deschamps_(peintre)

References

1846 births
1902 deaths
French artists
19th-century French artists
Artists from Paris
Recipients of the Legion of Honour
Section of Painting and Sculpture artists